This is a list of properties and districts in Whitfield County, Georgia, United States, that are listed on the National Register of Historic Places (NRHP).

Current listings

|}

References

Whitfield
Whitfield County, Georgia